Section 4 of the Constitution of Australia formally established the vice-regal position of the Governor-General of Australia.

External links
 Commonwealth Of Australia Constitution Act - Sect 4 at Austlii

Australian constitutional law